Erfurt II is an electoral constituency (German: Wahlkreis) represented in the Landtag of Thuringia. It elects one member via first-past-the-post voting. Under the current constituency numbering system, it is designated as constituency 25. It contains central and western parts of Erfurt, the capital and largest city of Thuringia.

Erfurt II was created in 1990 for the first state election. Since 2009, it has been represented by Susanne Hennig-Wellsow of The Left.

Geography
As of the 2019 state election, Erfurt II is located entirely within the urban district of Erfurt. It covers the central and western part of the city, specifically the city districts (Stadtteile) of Andreasvorstadt, Berliner Platz, Bindersleben, Brühlervorstadt, Ermstedt, Gottstedt, Ilversgehofen, Johannesplatz, Marbach, and Salomonsborn.

Members
The constituency was held by the Christian Democratic Union (CDU) from its creation in 1990 until 2009, during which time it was represented by Norbert Otto (1990–1994), Bernhard Vogel (1994–2004), and Michael Panse (2004–2009). It was won by The Left in 2009, and represented by Susanne Hennig-Wellsow. She was re-elected in 2014 and 2019.

Election results

2019 election

2014 election

2009 election

2004 election

1999 election

1994 election

1990 election

References

Electoral districts in Thuringia
Erfurt
1990 establishments in Germany
Constituencies established in 1990